Corythucha juglandis, the walnut lace bug, is a species of lace bug in the family Tingidae.  It is found in North America. It feeds on Tilia americana and overwinters in leaf litter. Both adults and nymphs are gregarious.

Taxonomy

Description

Range

Habitat

Behaviour

Diet and Feeding

Reproduction

Longevity and Mortality

Relationship with Humans

References

Further reading

 
 
 

Tingidae
Insects described in 1857
Hemiptera of North America